Banapple gas may refer to:

an alternative name for amyl nitrite
a song on the Cat Stevens' album Numbers